The Journal of Clinical Psychology is a monthly peer-reviewed medical journal covering psychological research, assessment, and practice. It was established in 1945. It covers research on psychopathology, psychodiagnostics, psychotherapy, psychological assessment and treatment matching, clinical outcomes, clinical health psychology, and behavioral medicine.

Each year, four of the monthly issues are dedicated to In Session, a section that focuses on clinical issues that may be encountered by psychotherapists. In Session is editorially independent from the main journal. From 1995 - 1999 it was published as a separate journal titled, In Session: Psychotherapy in Practice.

From time to time, the journal publishes special issues, containing a selection of articles related to a single particularly timely or important theme.

According to the Journal Citation Reports, the journal has a 2011 impact factor of 2.116, ranking it 31st out of 109 journals in the category "Psychology, Clinical."

In 2001, the editor-in-chief of the Journal of Clinical Psychology agreed to publish, without peer review, five articles on Roger Callahan's Thought Field Therapy. In lieu of peer review, critiques were published alongside each article. The critics agreed that each of the five studies contained serious flaws that rendered them uninterpretable by them and reinforced the conclusion that Thought Field Therapy was a pseudoscience.

References

External links 
 
 This article is based on a psychology.wikia.com article under Creative Commons as CC-BY-SA

Clinical psychology journals
Publications established in 1945
Abnormal psychology journals
Wiley-Blackwell academic journals
English-language journals
Psychotherapy journals